Champions Soccer Radio Network (CSRN) was a radio network based in Santa Monica, California that produced sports talk programmes, covered the news, scores and match highlights dedicated to the discussion of the sport of association football. CSRN was formed by English expatriates Graham J. Bell (former English FA-accredited referee) and Gary "Gazza" Richards (former-Queen's Park Rangers F.C. footballer and soccer pundit on Fox Soccer Channel's Super Sunday Plus).

History 
The 2G's Show was launched via Sirius Satellite Radio with a 2-hour pilot in December 2005 and this ultimately led to a regular hourly show in January 2006.

Shortly after, Bell and Richards moved to create and market their own soccer talk radio network and in February 2006 through the company "Champions Soccer Marketing, Inc.". CSRN began with two soccer talk radio programmes, The 2 G's, and The Treble—both shows immediately creating interest with both soccer fans worldwide and the advertising media.

Since the formation of the network, CSRN has incorporated more shows including Around the League in 90 Minutes (a two-hour weekly show dedicated to Major League Soccer), Divers and Cheats, The Chivas USA Show, The Arsenal Hour, Kopshop USA (a show dedicated to Liverpool F.C.), The European Football Show, Fantasy Football Advisor, Forza Football, American Soccer Show, and Glory Glory Leeds.

Programming information 
CSRN broadcasts their live sports talk programmes Monday through Friday beginning at 0900 PST through 1300 PST. Although most shows can then be downloaded via podcast, the network continues the feed with rebroadcasts throughout the afternoon and during the weekends and can also be heard at any time on CSRN's "On Demand" player.

The flagship show, The 2 G's is first broadcast live, daily, for 120 minutes and is followed by The European Football Show on Mondays, Around the League in 90 minutes on Tuesdays, Forza Futbol on Wednesdays, Divers and Cheats on Thursdays followed by The Treble and then The Arsenal Hour on Fridays. During the MLS off-season, The American Soccer Show is broadcast in place of Around the League... and the programming is moved up an hour.

CSRN hosts and shows 
 Gary Gazza Richards - The 2gs  - The Arsenal Hour
 Graham Bell – An Englishman in LA
 Lee Gadsby Basannavar – Gadsby's England
 Scott Bornstein – Around the League and Winning Ugly
 Ted Meyer – Around the League and Around the League Extra
 Chris Ballard – Around the League Extra
 Twiggster – Glory Glory Leeds
 William "Murph" Murphy – YSA Report-Philadelphia Union

References

External links 
 CSRN Official Website
 web.kwickie.com/ Gooaaal Football Show
 KCSN.org Alternative music radio

Radio stations established in 2006
Association football mass media
Sports radio networks in the United States
American sports radio programs
Sirius Satellite Radio

fr:Catégorie:Médias de football
nl:Categorie:Voetbal in de media
ja:Category:サッカーのメディア